Educational Measurement: Issues and Practice is a quarterly peer-reviewed academic journal published by Wiley-Blackwell on behalf of the National Council on Measurement in Education. The journal was established in 1982. Its current editor-in-chief is Deborah J. Harris. The journal covers educational measurement in the sense of both inferences made and actions taken on the basis of test scores or other modes of assessment.

Other journals published by NCME include the  Journal of Educational Measurement (JEM) and the Chinese/English Journal of Educational Measurement and Evaluation (CEJEME).

Abstracting and indexing 
Educational Measurement: Issues and Practice is abstracted and indexed in:

External links 
 

Wiley-Blackwell academic journals
English-language journals
Publications established in 1982
Education journals
Quarterly journals